The 2004 ICC Intercontinental Cup was the inaugural edition of the ICC Intercontinental Cup first class cricket tournament, an international cricket tournament between nations who have not been awarded Test status by the International Cricket Council. The tournament took place last from 25 March to 23 November 2004. The competition included 12 teams, divided by geographical region into four groups of three, followed by semi-finals and a final which were played 2 Venues In United Arab Emirates, The Sharjah Cricket Stadium In Sharjah and Sheikh Zayed Cricket Stadium In Abu Dhabi.

Points System
In order to encourage competitive play and avoid deadlocks, a point system including bonus points was used:
Win: 14 points
Tie: 7 points
Draw or loss: 0 points
Batting bonus points: 0.5 points for each 25 runs scored in the first 90 overs of each innings, to a maximum of 6 points per innings.
Bowling bonus points: 0.5 points per wicket taken in each innings.

Results

Africa Group

The major surprise in the African group was the victory of Uganda over Namibia. Uganda's subsequent loss against Kenya paved the way for the Kenyans to the next round, despite a player's strike the day before their match against Namibia.

Americas Group

Asia Group

Europe Group

Final round

Semi-finals

The semifinals was played in UAE, but were delayed because the death of Zayed bin Sultan Al Nahyan. Originally were scheduled to start on 16 November and were postponed one day. Canada and Scotland advanced to the final, both in draws by points.

Final
The final started at 21 November. Canada won the toss and elected to bat. However Canada had a poor start, losing Ashif Mulla to the last ball of the first over of the match, bowled by John Blain. In the same day, Scotland took advantage of 80 runs. In the second day Scotland declared with 177 runs ahead. Canada only scored 93 runs for the easy victory of Scotland.

Stats

Most runs

Most wickets

References

Intercontinental Cup
ICC Intercontinental Cup